"We Own It (Fast & Furious)" is a song by American rappers 2 Chainz and Wiz Khalifa that appears on the Fast & Furious 6 soundtrack. The song appears in the opening and end credits of the film. The song was also included as an international bonus track on 2 Chainz' second studio album B.O.A.T.S. II: Me Time. The song was used as the official theme for WWE's Royal Rumble 2014 event, as Chicago Cubs 3rd baseman Kris Bryant's walk-up song, and it was also featured on an episode of Parks and Recreation.

On June 27, 2013, Mike Posner created a remix version featuring Travis Mills, Sammy Adams, and Niykee Heaton.

Commercial performance
It reached number six on the UK Singles Chart, becoming 2 Chainz's most successful single in that country. On the week of June 8, 2013, it debuted on the US Billboard Hot 100 at number 61. It peaked at number 16. The single was certified 3× platinum by the Recording Industry Association of America and has sold over 3 million copies in the United States.

Charts

Weekly charts

Year-end charts

Certifications

Radio and release history

References

2013 singles
2013 songs
2 Chainz songs
Wiz Khalifa songs
Songs written by 2 Chainz
Def Jam Recordings singles
Songs written for films
Songs written by Breyan Isaac
Song recordings produced by the Futuristics
Songs written by Wiz Khalifa
Songs written by Joe Khajadourian
Songs written by Alex Schwartz